The 2015 Copa Colombia, officially the 2015 Copa Águila for sponsorship reasons, was the 13th edition of the Copa Colombia, the national cup competition for clubs of DIMAYOR. It began on 18 February and ended on 19 November. The tournament comprised a total of 36 teams, and the winner, Junior, who defeated Santa Fe 2–1 on aggregate score in the final, earned a berth to the 2016 Copa Sudamericana.

Format
Unlike the previous seven Copa Colombia editions, the 2015 competition featured a change in its format. According to the format approved by DIMAYOR at its Extraordinary Assembly on October 7, 2014, the first stage was played by 32 teams, which were split into eight groups of four teams each on a regional basis, where teams played each other of the teams in their group twice. The 8 group winners plus the best 4 second-placed teams joined the teams qualified for the 2015 Copa Libertadores (Atlético Nacional, Santa Fe, and Once Caldas) and the 2014 aggregate table best team not qualified for the Copa Libertadores (Águilas Doradas) in the round of 16, from where the cup continued on a home-and-away knockout basis.

Group stage

Group A

Group B

Group C

Group D

Group E

Group F

Group G

Group H

Ranking of second-placed teams
The four best teams among those ranked second qualified for the knockout stage.

Knockout phase
Each tie in the knockout phase is played in home-and-away two-legged format. In each tie, the team which has the better overall record up to that stage host the second leg, except in the round of 16 where the group winners automatically host the second leg. In case of a tie in aggregate score, neither the away goals rule nor extra time is applied, and the tie is decided by a penalty shoot-out. Atlético Nacional, Santa Fe, Once Caldas, and Águilas Doradas entered the competition in the Round of 16, being joined there by the eight group winners and the four best second-placed teams.

Bracket

Round of 16
First legs: July 15; Second legs: July 29. Group winners (Team 2) hosted the second leg.

|}

Quarterfinals
First legs: August 5, 12; Second legs: August 26, September 2. Team 2 hosted the second leg.

|}

Semifinals
First legs: September 23, October 7; Second legs: September 30, October 15. Team 2 hosted the second leg.

|}

Final
First leg: November 11; Second leg: November 19. Team 2 hosted the second leg.

|}

Top goalscorers

Source: Soccerway.com

References

External links 
 DIMAYOR's official website 

Copa Colombia seasons
1